The Badminton Competition at the 1995 Pan American Games was held from March 11 to March 26, 1995, in Mar del Plata, Argentina. There were five medal events. Badminton made its debut at the Pan American Games at this edition.

Participating nations
A total of 10 nations entered players in the badminton competitions, with a total of 56 athletes.

Men's competition

Singles

Doubles

Women's competition

Singles
In the women's singles, since the gold and silver medals won by the Canadian players, Robbyn Hermitage and Milaine Cloutier did not awarded the bronze medal although they were finished in the semi finals round. The bronze medal was later awarded to Beverly Tang from Trinidad and Tobago and Kathy Zimmermann from United States.

Doubles

Mixed Competition

Doubles

Medal table

References

 Sports 123
 Tournament link

 
P
Events at the 1995 Pan American Games
1995
Badminton tournaments in Argentina